Gorakhpur–Siliguri Expressway is an approved  long, four-lane (expandable to 6) access-controlled greenfield expressway, which will connect the city of Gorakhpur in Uttar Pradesh with the city of Siliguri in West Bengal, India. It will run almost parallel to the India–Nepal border, and will pass through three states–Uttar Pradesh, Bihar and West Bengal. As it will pass through close to the India–Nepal border, the project is of strategic importance for the country, as it will also benefit Nepal. It will be built at a cost of ₹ 32,000 crore, and will be completed by 2025, which was earlier scheduled at 2028/29. In the future, it will be extended to the capital of Assam and the largest city of Northeast India, Guwahati.

History
To improve connectivity, tourism, development and economic growth in Eastern as well as Northeast India, also including Nepal, the Ministry of Road Transport and Highways planned to build an expressway from Gorakhpur to Siliguri, by making it align close and parallel to the India–Nepal border. Once completed, these regions, along with Nepal with the advantage of close proximity to the expressway's route, will see exponential growth with the growth of industries and socio-economic development by promoting employment among people living in the regions, which the regions currently lack altogether. The expressway will have four lanes, and in its between, a 100×100 m space will be left, for two more lanes, to expand the expressway into six lanes at a future date. It will be built at a cost of ₹ 32,000 crore, and will be completed by 2025, which was earlier scheduled at 2028/29.

Route

|-
|UP
|
|-
|BH
|
|-
|WB
|
|-
|Total
|
|}

Uttar Pradesh

The expressway will start from the Gorakhpur Ring Road, or National Highway 27 (East–West Corridor) (NH-27) at Gorakhpur, Gorakhpur district, and will run mostly parallel with NH-27. It will connect the following districts along with their cities:

 Deoria district
 Kushinagar, Kushinagar district

Bihar

The expressway will pass through the following districts along with their cities:

 Gopalganj district
 West Champaran district
 Motihari, East Champaran district 
 Sheohar, Sheohar district
 Sitamarhi, Sitamarhi district
 Darbhanga district
 Madhubani, Madhubani district
 Supaul district
 Forbesganj, Araria district
 Araria district (continuation, will not pass through the city of Araria)
 Kishanganj district

West Bengal

The expressway will terminate again at NH-27 at Siliguri, Darjeeling district, and will pass through the following district along with its city before terminating:

 Islampur, Uttar Dinajpur district

Construction
The expressway will be fully four-lane,  access-controlled and a greenfield project, with a provision of expanding it into six lanes and an extension from Siliguri to Guwahati in Assam, at a future date. The alignment lies mostly along the India–Nepal border on its northern side and the National Highway 27 (East-West Corridor) on its southern side. The expressway will be built using the Engineering, Procurement and Construction (EPC) technology, which provides and ensures security, liability caps, and a performance guarantee for an infrastructure. The land acquisition for the project began in May 2022, and is underway. The tenders were launched by the National Highways Authority of India (NHAI) in January 2023. The expressway's Detailed Project Report (DPR) was completed by the Bhopal-based firm, L.N. Malviya Infra Projects Private Limited. Currently, the project is under bidding process and land acquisition. The expressway will be built at a cost of ₹ 32,000 crore, and as of March 2023, the package division for the project is underway, and so far, it has been divided into five packages. The following table lists the packages, contractors and their statuses.

Uttar Pradesh

Bihar

West Bengal

Benefits
The expressway will benefit Eastern and Northeast India as well as Nepal by many ways, as follows:

Trade: The expressway will help to boost trade by faster transportation of cargo from Eastern India, especially from Northeast India, as well as Nepal, and also because in the future it will be extended to Guwahati, resulting in growth in exports and reduced dependency on imports, thus enhancing the growth of the regions' economies and the growth of Nepal's economy.
Tourism: As this expressway will create a direct link from mainland India to Northeast India, it will result in a boost in tourist arrivals to northeast, as it is well known for its geography and environment. The rise in tourist arrivals will mark the growth and development of all dotted tourist attractions and destinations, including larger ones, all over the northeast region. It will also help Nepal in this respect, as it will create greater and faster accessibility, due to its proximity near the India–Nepal border.
Connectivity: The expressway will not only create a direct route from Gorakhpur to Northeast India, but will also connect the northeast region, along with the eastern half of Nepal, directly with the rest of India, through other expressways. For example, the connection with the national capital directly from Guwahati and Kathmandu will be created with the help of Gorakhpur–Shamli Expressway, and with the financial capital with the help of Delhi–Mumbai Expressway. This network will ensure faster, safet and better commute between the northeast region as well as Nepal.
Protection of the Environment: To protect the green cover, plants and trees will be planted in between and both sides along the entire route of the expressway.
Employment: Due to increase in industrial activities along the expressway's route, various agricultural and industrial initiatives will help the states' economies and growth, along with Nepal. The establishment of these numerous centres will result in multiple job possibilities for thousands of people living in both the states and the neighbouring country.

Status updates
2021: The plan of the expressway was proposed by the Ministry of Road Transport and Highways (MoRTH).
May 2022: Land acquisition began for the project.
January 2023: The National Highways Authority of India (NHAI) invited tenders for the project.

See also
 Expressways of India
 National Highway 27 (East-West Corridor) (NH-27)
 India–Nepal border

Notes

References

Proposed expressways in India
Expressways in West Bengal
Transport in Gorakhpur
Transport in Siliguri